Martin Lanig (born 11 July 1984) is a German former professional footballer who played as a defensive midfielder.

Career

Youth squads
Lanig began playing for SV Königshofen. Later he played for TSV Tauberbischofsheim and 1. FC Nürnberg.

FV Lauda, Hoffenheim, Greuther Fürth
Lanig started his career with lower division team FV Lauda in 2002. The next year he moved to the Regionalliga Süd club TSG 1899 Hoffenheim and in 2006 he signed with the 2. Bundesliga club SpVgg Greuther Fürth.

VfB Stuttgart, FC Köln, Eintracht Frankfurt
In July 2008, he transferred from Greuther Fürth to VfB Stuttgart, where he had the opportunity to play for the first time in the Bundesliga. Lanig scored his first goal for VfB Stuttgart on 5 October 2008 against Werder Bremen.

In July 2010, he moved to 1. FC Köln and two years later he transferred to Eintracht Frankfurt.

APOEL
On 23 January 2015, aged 30, Lanig moved abroad for the first time and signed an 18-month contract with Cypriot club APOEL FC. He made his debut on 31 January 2015, playing the full 90 minutes in APOEL's 0–1 away victory against Nea Salamina for the Cypriot First Division. He scored his first official goal for APOEL on 7 February 2015, opening the scoreline in his team's 4–0 home win over Ethnikos Achna for the Cypriot First Division. In his first season at APOEL, Lanig managed to win his first two career titles, as his team won both the Cypriot championship and the cup. On 16 June 2015, APOEL announced that Lanig's contract with the club was terminated by mutual consent, as the player wanted to return to Germany. APOEL was the last stop of his playing career, as a few months later, he announced his retirement from football at age 31, due to multiple and serious injuries.

Career statistics

Honours
APOEL
Cypriot First Division: 2014–15
Cypriot Cup: 2014–15

References

External links
  
 
 
 

1984 births
Living people
German footballers
Association football midfielders
Bundesliga players
2. Bundesliga players
3. Liga players
Cypriot First Division players
SpVgg Greuther Fürth players
TSG 1899 Hoffenheim II players
TSG 1899 Hoffenheim players
VfB Stuttgart II players
VfB Stuttgart players
1. FC Köln players
Eintracht Frankfurt players
APOEL FC players
German expatriate footballers
German expatriate sportspeople in Cyprus
Expatriate footballers in Cyprus
People from Bad Mergentheim
Sportspeople from Stuttgart (region)
Footballers from Baden-Württemberg